Kusaki Dam is a dam in the Gunma Prefecture of Japan.

References

Dams in Gunma Prefecture
Dams completed in 1976